Escándalo de medianoche is a 1923 Argentine black and white silent film. The film is starred by Felipe Farah, Amelia Mirel and José Pla

Escándalo de medianoche is based on El sombrero de tres picos, work of Pedro Antonio de Alarcón.

References

External links
 
 Escándalo a medianoche on Cinenacional.com.

1923 films
Argentine silent films
Argentine black-and-white films
1920s Spanish-language films
1940s Argentine films